The following is a list of the 32 municipalities (comuni) of the Province of La Spezia, Liguria, Italy.

List

See also 
List of municipalities of Italy

References 

La Spezia